The National Highway 45, also known as the N-45 or the Nowshera-Chitral Highway, is one of the National Highways of Pakistan, running from Nowshera District to the town of Chitral via Dir in the Khyber Pakhtunkhwa province. It is a two-lane highway with a total length of 309 km. It is maintained and operated by the National Highway Authority.

A tunnel on the highway, Lowari Tunnel reduced 14-hour drive from Chitral to Peshawar by 7 hours. It also reduced the time and effort it takes moving from Chitral to southern parts of Pakistan in winter season when Lowari Top is closed due to snow and people of Chitral have to travel from Afghanistan and then enter back in Pakistan.

See also 
 Motorways of Pakistan
 Transport in Pakistan

References

External links
 N-45 Map
 National Highway Authority

Roads in Khyber Pakhtunkhwa